Asaphocrita irenica is a moth in the family Blastobasidae. It is found in North America, from California to British Columbia.

The wingspan is about 20 mm. The forewings are grayish white with brown-gray sprinkling. The hindwings are shining yellowish gray.

References

Moths described in 1907
irenica